Tazria, Thazria, Thazri'a, Sazria, or Ki Tazria (—Hebrew for "childbirth", the 13th word, and the first distinctive word, in the parashah, where the root word  means "seed") is the 27th weekly Torah portion (parashah) in the annual Jewish cycle of Torah reading and the fourth in the Book of Leviticus. The parashah deals with ritual impurity. It constitutes . The parashah is made up of 3,667 Hebrew letters, 1,010 Hebrew words, 67 verses, and 128 lines in a Torah Scroll (Sefer Torah).

Jews read it the 27th or 28th Sabbath after Simchat Torah, generally in April or, rarely, in late March or early May. The lunisolar Hebrew calendar contains up to 55 weeks, the exact number varying between 50 in common years and 54 or 55 in leap years. In leap years (for example, 2019, 2022, 2024, and 2027), parashah Tazria is read separately. In common years (for example, 2018, 2020, 2021, 2023, 2025, 2026, and 2028), parashah Tazria is combined with the next parashah, Metzora, to help achieve the number of weekly readings needed.

Readings

First reading—Leviticus 12:1–13:5
In the first reading, God told Moses to tell the Israelites that when a woman at childbirth bore a boy, she was to be unclean 7 days and then remain in a state of blood purification for 33 days, while if she bore a girl, she was to be unclean 14 days and then remain in a state of blood purification for 66 days. Upon completing her period of purification, she was to bring a lamb for a burnt offering and a pigeon or a turtle dove for a sin offering, and the priest was to offer them as sacrifices to make expiation on her behalf. If she could not afford a sheep, she was to take two turtle doves or two pigeons, one for a burnt offering and the other for a sin offering. God told Moses and Aaron that when a person had a swelling, rash, discoloration, scaly affection, inflammation, or burn, it was to be reported to the priest, who was to examine it to determine whether the person was clean or unclean.

Second reading—Leviticus 13:6–17
In the second reading, the priest was to examine the person again the seventh day to determine whether the person was clean or unclean. The reading goes on to describe the features of skin disease.

Third reading—Leviticus 13:18–23
The third reading further describes features of skin disease.

Fourth reading—Leviticus 13:24–28
The fourth reading further describes features of skin disease.

Fifth reading—Leviticus 13:29–39
The fifth reading describes features of skin disease on the head or beard. In , "then he shall be shaven," the word  is spelled with a large gimel.

Sixth reading—Leviticus 13:40–54
The sixth reading continued the discussion of skin disease on the head or beard. Unclean persons were to rend their clothes, leave their head bare, cover over their upper lips, call out, "Unclean! Unclean!" and dwell outside the camp. When a streaky green or red eruptive affection occurred in wool, linen, or animal skin, it was to be shown to the priest, who was to examine to determine whether it was clean or unclean. If unclean, it was to be burned.

Seventh reading—Leviticus 13:55–59
In the seventh reading, if the affliction disappeared from the article upon washing, it was to be shut up seven days, washed again, and be clean.

In inner-biblical interpretation
The parashah has parallels or is discussed in these Biblical sources:

Leviticus chapter 12
 associates childbirth with uncleanness. In the Hebrew Bible, uncleanness has a variety of associations. And perhaps similarly,  associates it with skin disease.  associates it with various sexuality-related events. And , 23; ; ; and  associate it with contact with the worship of alien gods.

Leviticus chapter 13
The Hebrew Bible reports skin disease (tzara'at) and a person affected by skin disease (metzora) at several places, often (and sometimes incorrectly) translated as "leprosy" and "a leper." In , to help Moses to convince others that God had sent him, God instructed Moses to put his hand into his bosom, and when he took it out, his hand was "leprous (m'tzora'at), as white as snow." In , the Torah sets out regulations for skin disease (tzara'at) and a person affected by skin disease (metzora). In , after Miriam spoke against Moses, God's cloud removed from the Tent of Meeting and "Miriam was leprous (m'tzora'at), as white as snow." In , Moses warned the Israelites in the case of skin disease (tzara'at) diligently to observe all that the priests would teach them, remembering what God did to Miriam. In 2 Kings , part of the haftarah for parashah Tazria, the prophet Elisha cures Naaman, the commander of the army of the king of Aram, who was a "leper" (metzora). In , part of the haftarah for parashah Metzora, the story is told of four "leprous men" (m'tzora'im) at the gate during the Arameans' siege of Samaria. And in 2 Chronicles , after King Uzziah tried to burn incense in the Temple in Jerusalem, "leprosy (tzara'at) broke forth on his forehead".

In early nonrabbinic interpretation
The parashah has parallels or is discussed in these early nonrabbinic sources:

Leviticus chapter 13
Philo taught that the skin disease in  signified voluntary depravity.

In classical rabbinic interpretation
The parashah is discussed in these rabbinic sources from the era of the Mishnah and the Talmud:

Leviticus chapter 12

Reading , “If a woman conceives,” Rabbi Levi said three things:  It is only natural that if a person has given into another's keeping an ounce of silver in private, and the latter returns a pound of gold in public, the former will surely be grateful to the latter; and so is it with God.  Human beings entrust to God a drop of fluid in privacy, and God openly returns to them completed and perfected human beings.  Rabbi Levi said a second thing:  It is natural that, if a person is confined without attention to a chamber, and someone comes and kindles a light for the person there, the former should feel gratitude towards the latter.  So too is it with God.  When the embryo is in its mother's womb, God causes a light to shine for it there with which it can see from one end of the world to the other.  Rabbi Levi said a third thing:  It is natural that, if a person is confined without attention to a chamber, and someone comes and releases the person and takes the person out from there, the former should feel gratitude to the latter.  Even so, when the embryo is in its mother's womb, God comes and releases it and brings it forth into the world.

Rabbi Ammi taught in the name of Rabbi Johanan that even though Rabbi Simeon ruled that a dissolved fetus expelled by a woman was not unclean, Rabbi Simeon nonetheless agreed that the woman was ritually unclean as a woman who bore a child. Those words imply that even if a woman bore something like "conceived seed" (in a fluid state), she was nonetheless unclean by reason of childbirth.

The Mishnah taught that circumcision should not be performed until the sun has risen, but counts it as done if done after dawn has appeared. A Baraita interpreted  to teach that the whole eighth day is valid for circumcision, but deduced from Abraham's rising "early in the morning" to perform his obligations in  that the zealous perform circumcisions early in the morning.

The disciples of Rabbi Simeon ben Yohai asked him why  ordained that after childbirth a woman had to bring a sacrifice. He replied that when she bore her child, she swore impetuously in the pain of childbirth that she would never again have intercourse with her husband. The Torah, therefore, ordained that she had to bring a sacrifice, as she would probably violate that oath. Rabbi Berekiah and Rabbi Simon said in the name of Rabbi Simeon ben Yohai that because she fluttered in her heart, she had to bring a fluttering sacrifice, two turtle-doves or two young pigeons. The disciples asked Rabbi Simeon ben Yohai why  permitted contact between the father and mother after 7 days when the mother bore a boy, but  permitted contact after 14 days when she bore a girl. He replied that since everyone around the mother would rejoice upon the birth of a boy, she would regret her oath to shun her husband after just 7 days, but since people around her would not rejoice on the birth of a girl, she would take twice as long. And Rabbi Simeon ben Yohai taught that  ordained circumcision on the eighth day so that the parents could join their guests in a celebratory mood on that day.

; ; ; and  provided that people of lesser means could bring less-expensive offerings. The Mishnah taught that one who sacrificed much and one who sacrificed little attained equal merit, so long as they directed their hearts to Heaven. Rabbi Zera taught that  provided a Scriptural proof for this when it says, "Sweet is the sleep of a serving man, whether he eat little or much." Rav Adda bar Ahavah taught that  provided a Scriptural proof for this when it says, "When goods increase, they are increased who eat them; and what advantage is there to the owner thereof." Rabbi Simeon ben Azzai taught that Scripture says of a large ox, "An offering made by fire of a sweet savor"; of a small bird, "An offering made by fire of a sweet savor"; and of a meal-offering, "An offering made by fire of a sweet savor." Rabbi Simeon ben Azzai thus taught that Scripture uses the same expression each time to teach that it is the same whether people offered much or little, so long as they directed their hearts to Heaven. Rabbi Isaac taught that  uses the word "soul" (nefesh) because God noted that the one who usually brought a meal-offering was a poor man, and God accounted it as if the poor man had offered his own soul.

Rabbi Simeon noted that Scripture always lists turtledoves before pigeons, and imagined that one might thus think that Scripture prefers turtledoves over pigeons.

The Mishnah (following ) taught that a sin-offering of a bird preceded a burnt-offering of a bird; and the priest also dedicated them in that order. Rabbi Eliezer taught that wherever an offerer (because of poverty) substituted for an animal sin-offering the offering of two birds (one of which was for a sin-offering and the other for a burnt-offering), the priest sacrificed the bird sin-offering before the bird burnt-offering (as  instructs). Wherever the offering came on account of sin, the sin-offering took precedence. But here (in the case of a woman after childbirth, where the sin-offering was not on account of sin) the burnt-offering took precedence. And wherever both birds came instead of one animal sin-offering, the sin-offering took precedence. But here (in the case of a woman after childbirth) they did not both come on account of a sin-offering (for in poverty she substituted a bird burnt-offering for an animal burnt-offering, as  required her to bring a bird sin-offering in any case), the burnt-offering took precedence. (The Gemara asked whether this contradicted the Mishnah, which taught that a bird sin-offering took precedence over an animal burnt-offering, whereas here she brought the animal burnt-offering before the bird sin-offering.) Rava taught that  merely accorded the bird burnt-offering precedence in the mentioning. (Thus, some read Rava to teach that  lets the reader read first about the burnt-offering, but in fact the priest sacrificed the sin-offering first. Others read Rava to teach that one first dedicated the animal or bird for the burnt-offering and then dedicated the bird for the sin-offering, but in fact the priest sacrificed the sin-offering first.)

 called for "two turtle-doves, or two young pigeons: the one for a burnt-offering, and the other for a sin-offering". Rav Hisda taught that the designation of one of the birds to become the burnt-offering and the other to become the sin-offering was made either by the owner or by the priest's action.

Leviticus chapter 13
Reading , a Midrash taught that in 18 verses, Scripture places Moses and Aaron (the instruments of Israel's deliverance) on an equal footing (reporting that God spoke to both of them alike), and thus there are 18 benedictions in the Amidah.

But the king told her: "Do not fear; these are meant for the slaves, but you are here to eat, drink, and make merry." So, too, when the Israelites heard the section of Scripture dealing with leprous affections, they became afraid. But Moses told them: "These are meant for the wicked nations, but you are intended to eat, drink, and be joyful, as it is written in  "Many are the sufferings of the wicked; but he that trusts in the Lord, mercy surrounds him."

Rabbi Johanan said in the name of Rabbi Joseph ben Zimra that anyone who bears evil tales (lashon hara) will be visited by the plague of skin disease (tzara'at), as it is said in  "Whoever slanders his neighbor in secret, him will I destroy (azmit)." And the Gemara reported that in the Land of Israel they taught that slander kills three persons: the slanderer, the one who accepts it, and the one about whom the slander is told.

Similarly, Rabbi Haninah taught that skin disease came only from slander. The Rabbis found a proof for this from the case of Miriam, arguing that because she uttered slander against Moses, plagues attacked her. And the Rabbis read  to support this when it says in connection with skin disease, "remember what the Lord your God did to Miriam".

Rabbi Samuel bar Nahmani said in the name of Rabbi Johanan that skin disease results from seven sins: slander, the shedding of blood, vain oath, incest, arrogance, robbery, and envy. The Gemara cited Scriptural bases for each of the associations: For slander, ; for bloodshed, ; for a vain oath, ; for incest, ; for arrogance, ; for robbery,  (as a Tanna taught that those who collect money that does not belong to them will see a priest come and scatter their money around the street); and for envy, .

Similarly, a Midrash taught that skin disease resulted from 10 sins: (1) idol-worship, (2) unchastity, (3) bloodshed, (4) the profanation of the Divine Name, (5) blasphemy of the Divine Name, (6) robbing the public, (7) usurping a dignity to which one has no right, (8) overweening pride, (9) evil speech, and (10) an evil eye.

Similarly, Rabbi Judah the Levite, son of Rabbi Shalom, inferred that skin disease comes because of eleven sins: (1) for cursing the Divine Name, (2) for immorality, (3) for bloodshed, (4) for ascribing to another a fault that is not in him, (5) for haughtiness, (6) for encroaching upon other people's domains, (7) for a lying tongue, (8) for theft, (9) for swearing falsely, (10) for profanation of the name of Heaven, and (11) for idolatry. Rabbi Isaac added: for ill-will. And our Rabbis said: for despising the words of the Torah.

Reading , "My ordinances (mishpatai) shall you do, and My statutes (chukotai) shall you keep", the Sifra distinguished "ordinances" (mishpatim) from "statutes" (chukim). The term "ordinances" (mishpatim), taught the Sifra, refers to rules that even had they not been written in the Torah, it would have been entirely logical to write them, like laws pertaining to theft, sexual immorality, idolatry, blasphemy and murder. In regard to these, taught the Sifra, the Torah says simply that God legislated them and we have no right to raise doubts about them.

It was taught in a Baraita that four types of people are accounted as though they were dead: a poor person, a person affected by skin disease (metzora), a blind person, and one who is childless. A poor person is accounted as dead, for  says, "for all the men are dead who sought your life" (and the Gemara interpreted this to mean that they had been stricken with poverty). A person affected by skin disease (metzora) is accounted as dead, for  says, "And Aaron looked upon Miriam, and behold, she was leprous (metzora'at). And Aaron said to Moses . . . let her not be as one dead." The blind are accounted as dead, for  says, "He has set me in dark places, as they that be dead of old".

And Rabbi Meir taught that the priest could not examine his relatives. The Mishnah taught that anyone could inspect skin disease, but only a priest could declare it unclean or clean. The Mishnah taught that the priests delayed examining a bridegroom—as well as his house and his garment—until after his seven days of rejoicing, and delayed examining anyone until after a holy day.

The Gemara taught that the early scholars were called soferim (related to the original sense of its root safar, "to count") because they used to count all the letters of the Torah (to ensure the correctness of the text). They used to say the vav in gachon,  ("belly"), in  marks the half-way point of the letters in the Torah. They used to say the words darosh darash,  ("diligently inquired"), in  mark the half-way point of the words in the Torah. And they used to say  marks the half-way point of the verses in the Torah. Rav Joseph asked whether the vav in gachon,  ("belly"), in  belonged to the first half or the second half of the Torah. (Rav Joseph presumed that the Torah contains an even number of letters.) The scholars replied that they could bring a Torah Scroll and count, for Rabbah bar bar Hanah said on a similar occasion that they did not stir from where they were until a Torah Scroll was brought and they counted. Rav Joseph replied that they (in Rabbah bar bar Hanah's time) were thoroughly versed in the proper defective and full spellings of words (that could be spelled in variant ways), but they (in Rav Joseph's time) were not. Similarly, Rav Joseph asked whether  belongs to the first half or the second half of verses. Abaye replied that for verses, at least, we can bring a Scroll and count them. But Rav Joseph replied that even with verses, they could no longer be certain. For when Rav Aha bar Adda came (from the Land of Israel to Babylon), he said that in the West (in the Land of Israel), they divided  into three verses. Nonetheless, the Rabbis taught in a Baraita that there are 5,888 verses in the Torah.

Rava recounted a Baraita that taught that the rule of  regarding one with skin disease, "the hair of his head shall be loose", also applied to a High Priest. The status of a High Priest throughout the year corresponded with that of any other person on a festival (with regard to mourning). For the Mishnah said that the High Priest could bring sacrifices on the altar even before he had buried his dead, but he could not eat sacrificial meat. From this restriction of a High Priest, the Gemara inferred that the High Priest would deport himself as a person with skin disease during a festival. And the Gemara continued to teach that a mourner is forbidden to cut his hair, because since  ordained for the sons of Aaron: "Let not the hair of your heads go loose" (after the death of their brothers Nadab and Abihu), we infer that cutting hair is forbidden for everybody else (during mourning), as well.

Rabbi Abbahu, as well as Rabbi Uzziel the grandson of Rabbi Uzziel the Great, taught that  requires that the person afflicted with skin disease "cry, ‘Unclean! Unclean!'" to warn passers-by to keep away. But the Gemara cited a Baraita that taught that  requires that the person "cry, ‘Unclean! Unclean!'" so that the person's distress would become known to many people, so that many could pray for mercy on the afflicted person's behalf. And the Gemara concluded that  reads "Unclean" twice to teach that  is intended to further both purposes, to keep passers-by away and to invite their prayers for mercy.

A Midrash taught that Divine Justice first attacks a person's substance and then the person's body. So when leprous plagues come upon a person, first they come upon the fabric of the person's house. If the person repents, then  requires that only the affected stones need to be pulled out; if the person does not repent, then  requires pulling down the house. Then the plagues come upon the person's clothes. If the person repents, then the clothes require washing; if not, they require burning. Then the plagues come upon the person's body. If the person repents,  provides for purification; if not, then  ordains that the person "shall dwell alone".

Similarly, the Tosefta reported that when a person would come to the priest, the priest would tell the person to engage in self-examination and turn from evil ways. The priest would continue that plagues come only from gossip, and skin disease from arrogance. But God would judge in mercy. The plague would come to the house, and if the homeowner repented, the house required only dismantling, but if the homeowner did not repent, the house required demolition. They would appear on clothing, and if the owner repented, the clothing required only tearing, but if the owner did not repent, the clothing required burning. They would appear on the person's body, and if the person repented, well and good, but if the person did not repent,  required that the person "shall dwell alone".

Rabbi Samuel bar Elnadab asked Rabbi Haninah (or others say Rabbi Samuel bar Nadab the son-in-law of Rabbi Haninah asked Rabbi Haninah, or still others say, asked Rabbi Joshua ben Levi) what distinguished the person afflicted with skin disease that  ordains that the person "shall dwell alone". The answer was that through gossip, the person afflicted with skin disease separated husband from wife, one neighbor from another, and therefore the Torah punished the person afflicted with skin disease measure for measure, ordaining that the person "shall dwell alone".

In a Baraita, Rabbi Jose related that a certain Elder from Jerusalem told him that 24 types of patients are afflicted with boils. The Gemara then related that Rabbi Joḥanan warned to be careful of the flies found on those afflicted with the disease ra’atan, as flies carried the disease. Rabbi Zeira would not sit in a spot where the wind blew from the direction of someone afflicted with ra’atan. Rabbi Elazar would not enter the tent of one afflicted with ra’atan, and Rabbi Ami and Rabbi Asi would not eat eggs from an alley in which someone afflicted with ra’atan lived. When Rabbi Joshua ben Levi was on the verge of dying, the Gemara told, the Angel of Death was instructed to perform Rabbi Joshua's bidding, as he was a righteous man and deserves to die in the manner he saw fit. Rabbi Joshua ben Levi asked the Angel of Death to show him his place in paradise, and the Angel agreed. Rabbi Joshua ben Levi asked the Angel to give him the knife that the Angel used to kill people, lest the Angel frighten him on the way, and the Angel gave it to him. When they arrived in paradise, the Angel lifted Rabbi Joshua so that he could see his place in paradise, and Rabbi Joshua jumped to the other side, escaping into paradise. Elijah the Prophet then told those in paradise to make way for Rabbi Joshua.

The Gemara told that Rabbi Joshua ben Levi asked Elijah when the Messiah would come, and Elijah told Rabbi Joshua ben Levi that he could find the Messiah sitting at the entrance of the city of Rome among the poor who suffer from illnesses.

In medieval Jewish interpretation
The parashah is discussed in these medieval Jewish sources:

Leviticus chapter 12

Maimonides taught that the laws of impurity serve many uses: (1) They keep Jews at a distance from dirty and filthy objects. (2) They guard the Sanctuary. (3) They pay regard to an established custom. (4) They lightened the burden. For these laws do not impede people affected with impurity in their ordinary occupations. For the distinction between pure and impure applies only with reference to the Sanctuary and the holy objects connected with it; it does not apply to other cases. Citing , "She shall touch no hallowed thing, nor come into the Sanctuary," Maimonides noted that people who do not intend to enter the Sanctuary or touch any holy thing are not guilty of any sin if they remain unclean as long as they like, and eat, according to their pleasure, ordinary food that has been in contact with unclean things.

In modern interpretation
The parashah is discussed in these modern sources:

Leviticus chapter 12
Dr. Elaine Goodfriend of California State University, Northridge, observed that  and its focus on menstruating women had an enormous effect on Jewish women's lives. Goodfriend reported that "the view that women—via their normal, recurring bodily functions—generate a pollution antagonistic to holiness served as a justification for women's distance from the sacred throughout Jewish history." Goodfriend speculated the priesthood excluded women because of "fear that the sudden onset of menstruation would result in the clash of impurity and holiness, with presumed dire consequences." Goodfriend noted that these laws and associated customs affected both women's public religious life and private family life, as they and their husbands were prohibited from sex for extensive periods of time, affecting their fertility and married life in general.

Leviticus chapter 13
Speiser argued that in context, the word cannot be mistaken for the title of the Pentateuch as a whole.

Commandments

According to Maimonides
Maimonides cited verses in this parashah for 3 positive and 1 negative commandments:

To circumcise the son, as it is written "and on the eighth day the flesh of his foreskin shall be circumcised"
For a woman after childbirth to bring a sacrifice after she becomes clean, as it is written "and when the days of her purification are fulfilled"
Not to shave off the hair of the scall, as it is written "but the scall shall he not shave"
For the person with skin disease to be known to all by the things written about the person, "his clothes shall be rent, and the hair of his head shall go loose, and he shall cover his upper lip, and shall cry: 'unclean, unclean.'" So too, all other unclean persons must declare themselves.

According to Sefer ha-Chinuch
According to Sefer ha-Chinuch, there are 5 positive and 2 negative commandments in the parashah:

The precept about the ritual uncleanness of a woman after childbirth
A ritually unclean person is not to eat meat of holy sacrifices.
The precept of a woman's offering after giving birth
The precept regarding the ritual uncleanness of a m'tzora (person with skin disease (tzara'at)
The prohibition against shaving the area of a nethek (an impurity in hair)
That one with skin disease (tzara'at), among others, should rend clothes.

In the liturgy

The Weekly Maqam
In the Weekly Maqam, Sephardi Jews each week base the songs of the services on the content of that week's parashah. For parashah Tazria, Sephardi Jews apply Maqam Saba, the maqam that symbolizes a covenant (brit). This is appropriate, because this parashah commences with the discussion of what to do when a baby boy is born. It also mentions the brit milah, a ritual that shows a covenant between man and God.

Haftarah

Summary

A man from Baal-shalishah brought the prophet Elisha bread of the First Fruits—20 loaves of barley—and fresh grain in his sack to give to the people to eat. Elisha's servant asked Elisha how he could feed a hundred men with these rations, but Elisha told his servant to give the food to the people, for God said that they would eat and have food left over. So the servant set the food before the men, they ate, and they had food left over, just as God had said.

Naaman, the commander of the army of the king of Aram, was a great warrior, but he was a leper. The girl who waited on Naaman's wife was an Israelite whom the Arameans had taken captive, and she told Naaman's wife that if Naaman went to Elisha in Samaria, then Elisha would cure Naaman of his leprosy. Naaman told his lord the king of Aram what the girl said, and the king of Aram sent Naaman on his way with a letter to the king of Israel. Naaman departed, taking with him ten talents of silver, 6,000 pieces of gold, and ten changes of clothes. Naaman brought the king of Israel the letter, which asked the king of Israel to cure Naaman of his leprosy. When the king of Israel read the letter, he rent his clothes and complained that he was not God with power over life and death, but the king of Aram must have been seeking some pretext to attack Israel.

When Elisha heard, he invited the king to send Naaman to him, and so Naaman came to Elisha's house with his horses and his chariots. Elisha sent a messenger to Naaman to tell him to wash seven times in the Jordan River and be healed, but that angered Naaman, who expected Elisha to come out, call on the name of God, and wave his hands over Naaman. Naaman asked whether the Amanah and Pharpar rivers of Damascus were not better than any river in Israel, so that he might wash in them and be clean.

But Naaman's servants advised him that if Elisha had directed him to do some difficult thing he would have done it, so how much more should he do what Elisha directed when he said merely to wash and be clean. So Naaman dipped himself seven times in the Jordan, and his flesh came back like the flesh of a little child.

Naaman returned to Elisha, avowed that there is no God except in Israel, and asked Elisha to take a present, but Elisha declined. Naaman asked if he might take two mule loads of Israel's earth so that Naaman might make offerings to God, and he asked that God might pardon Naaman when had had to bow before the Aramean idol Rimmon when the king of Aram leaned on Naaman to bow before Rimmon. And Elisha told Naaman to go in peace.

Connection to the parashah
Both the parashah and the haftarah report the treatment of skin disease, the parashah by the priests, and the haftarah by the prophet Elisha. Both the parashah and the haftarah frequently employ the term for skin disease (tzara'at).

A Midrash deduced from the characterization of Naaman as a "great man" in  that Naaman was haughty on account of his being a great warrior, and as a result was smitten with leprosy.

And fundamentally, both the parashah and the haftarah view skin disease as related to the Divine sphere and an occasion for interaction with God.

The haftarah in classical rabbinic interpretation

The Mekhilta of Rabbi Ishmael considered Naaman a more righteous convert than Jethro. The Babylonian Talmud, however, taught that Naaman was merely a resident alien who observed the seven Noahide commandments (including the prohibition on idolatry).

On Shabbat HaChodesh
When the parashah coincides with Shabbat HaChodesh ("Sabbath [of] the month," the special Sabbath preceding the Hebrew month of Nissan—as it does in 2022), the haftarah is:
for Ashkenazi Jews: 
for Sephardi Jews:

Connection to the Special Sabbath
On Shabbat HaChodesh, Jews read , in which God commands that "This month [Nissan] shall be the beginning of months; it shall be the first month of the year," and in which God issued the commandments of Passover. Similarly, the haftarah in  discusses Passover. In both the special reading and the haftarah, God instructs the Israelites to apply blood to doorposts.

Parashah Tazria-Metzora
When parashah Tazria is combined with parashah Metzora (as it is in 2018, 2020, 2021, 2025, and 2028) and it is not a special Sabbath, the haftarah is the haftarah for parashah Metzora, .

Summary

During the Arameans' siege of Samaria, four leprous men at the gate asked each other why they should die there of starvation, when they might go to the Arameans, who would either save them or leave them no worse than they were. When at twilight, they went to the Arameans' camp, there was no one there, for God had made the Arameans hear chariots, horses, and a great army, and fearing the Hittites and the Egyptians, they fled, leaving their tents, their horses, their donkeys, and their camp. The lepers went into a tent, ate and drank, and carried away silver, gold, and clothing from the tents and hid it.

Feeling qualms of guilt, they went to go tell the king of Samaria, and called to the porters of the city telling them what they had seen, and the porters told the king's household within. The king arose in the night, and told his servants that he suspected that the Arameans had hidden in the field, thinking that when the Samaritans came out, they would be able to get into the city. One of his servants suggested that some men take five of the horses that remained and go see, and they took two chariots with horses to go and see. They went after the Arameans as far as the Jordan River, and all the way was littered with garments and vessels that the Arameans had cast away in their haste, and the messengers returned and told the king. So the people went out and looted the Arameans' camp, so that the price of fine flour and two measures of barley each dropped to a shekel, as God had said it would. And the king appointed the captain on whom he leaned to take charge of the gate, and the people trampled him and killed him before he could taste of the flour, just as the man of God Elisha had said.

Connection to the double parashah

Both the double parashah and the haftarah deal with people stricken with skin disease. Both the parashah and the haftarah employ the term for the person affected by skin disease (metzora). In parashah Tazria,  provides that the person with skin disease "shall dwell alone; without the camp shall his dwelling be," thus explaining why the four leprous men in the haftarah lived outside the gate.

In parashah Metzora, when there "seems" to be a plague in the house, the priest must not jump to conclusions, but must examine the facts.

On Shabbat Rosh Chodesh

Notes

Further reading
The parashah has parallels or is discussed in these sources:

Biblical

 (circumcision).
 (God's help for the needy who cry out);  (God's healing).

Early nonrabbinic
Jubilees 3:8–14 Land of Israel, 2nd century BCE. (days of defilement after childbirth).
Philo. On the Posterity of Cain and His Exile 13:47; On the Unchangeableness of God 25:123–24; 27:127; Concerning Noah's Work as a Planter 26:111; On the Prayers and Curses Uttered by Noah When He Became Sober 10:49. Alexandria, Egypt, early 1st century CE. In, e.g., The Works of Philo: Complete and Unabridged, New Updated Edition. Translated by Charles Duke Yonge, pages 136, 168, 200, 231. Peabody, Massachusetts: Hendrickson Publishers, 1993.
Josephus, Antiquities of the Jews 3:11:3–5. Circa 93–94. In, e.g., The Works of Josephus: Complete and Unabridged, New Updated Edition. Translated by William Whiston, pages 96–97. Peabody, Massachusetts: Hendrickson Publishers, 1987.
Luke  (days of purification after birth).

Classical rabbinic

Mishnah: Megillah 2:4; Nazir 7:3; Sotah 3:8; Avot 3:18; Horayot 3:5; Zevachim 10:4; Arakhin 2:1, Keritot 6:9; Kinnim 1:1–3:6; Negaim 1:1–14:13. Land of Israel, circa 200 CE. In, e.g., The Mishnah: A New Translation. Translated by Jacob Neusner, pages 319, 444, 453, 681, 695, 722, 811, 851, 883–89, 981–1012. New Haven: Yale University Press, 1988.
Tosefta: Bikkurim 2:6; Shabbat 8:27; Megillah 2:4; Sotah 6:7; Eduyot 2:4; Negaim 1:1–9:9. Land of Israel, circa 250 CE. In, e.g., The Tosefta: Translated from the Hebrew, with a New Introduction. Translated by Jacob Neusner, volume 1, pages 350, 385, 857; volume 2, pages 1253, 1709–44. Peabody, Massachusetts: Hendrickson Publishers, 2002.
Sifra 121:1–147:16. Land of Israel, 4th century CE. In, e.g., Sifra: An Analytical Translation. Translated by Jacob Neusner, volume 2, pages 231–323. Atlanta: Scholars Press, 1988.
Jerusalem Talmud: Kilayim 76a; Maaser Sheni 46b; Shabbat 10b, 19a, 98a; Pesachim 14b, 45b, 55a, 78a; Shekalim 4a, 24b; Rosh Hashanah 5b; Megillah 12a, 25b; Yevamot 44a; Nedarim 12b–13a, 31a; Nazir 20a, 52a; Sotah 19b, 44a; Kiddushin 19b; Sanhedrin 63b; Shevuot 2b; Niddah 1a–. Tiberias, Land of Israel, circa 400 CE. In, e.g., Talmud Yerushalmi. Edited by Chaim Malinowitz, Yisroel Simcha Schorr, and Mordechai Marcus, volumes 5, 10, 13, 15, 18–20, 24, 26, 30, 33–37, 40, 45–46, _. Brooklyn: Mesorah Publications, 2008–2020.
Mekhilta of Rabbi Simeon 10:2. Land of Israel, 5th century. In, e.g., Mekhilta de-Rabbi Shimon bar Yohai. Translated by W. David Nelson, page 31. Philadelphia: Jewish Publication Society, 2006.
Leviticus Rabbah 2:6; 5:5; 14:1–16:1; 16:3–4, 6; 17:3–4; 18:2, 4–5; 21:2; 27:1, 10; 36:1. Land of Israel, 5th century. In, e.g., Midrash Rabbah: Leviticus. Translated by Harry Freedman and Maurice Simon, volume 4, pages 24, 70, 177–98, 202, 205–07, 216–17, 219, 229, 232–33, 266, 344, 354, 456. London: Soncino Press, 1939.
Babylonian Talmud: Berakhot 4a, 5b, 25a; Shabbat 2b, 24b, 26b, 28a, 54a, 55b, 67a, 94b, 132a–b, 134b–35a; Eruvin 24a, 32a, 37a; Pesachim 3a, 4a, 9b, 67a–b, 75a, 84a, 90b, 92a, 113b; Yoma 6a, 9b, 28b, 34b, 41a, 42a, 81a; Sukkah 28b; Megillah 8b, 20a, 24b; Moed Katan 5a, 7a–8a, 14b–15a; Chagigah 11a, 18b; Yevamot 4b, 47b, 72b, 74b–75a, 83a, 103b–04a; Ketubot 61b, 75b; Nedarim 4b; Nazir 17b, 26b–27a, 29a, 43a, 54b, 56b, 59b, 64b, 65b; Sotah 5a, 23a, 32b; Kiddushin 13b, 25a, 30a, 35b; Bava Kamma 11a, 80a, 92b; Bava Metzia 86a; Bava Batra 84a, 127a; Sanhedrin 4a, 11a, 26a, 34b, 54b, 59b, 68a, 83b, 87b–88a, 97a, 101a; Makkot 8b, 14b, 20b, 22a; Shevuot 2a, 6a–7a, 8a, 11a, 16a, 17b; Avodah Zarah 23b, 42a; Horayot 10a; Zevachim 19b, 32b, 33b, 38a, 49b, 67b, 76b, 90a, 94a, 102a, 105b, 112b, 117a; Menachot 4b, 6b, 37b, 39b, 91b; Chullin 8a, 24a, 31b, 41b, 51b, 63a, 71a, 77b–78a, 84b–85a, 109b, 134a; Bekhorot 17a, 27b, 34b, 41a, 47b; Arakhin 3a, 8b, 15b–16b, 18b, 21a; Temurah 26b; Keritot 7b–8b, 9b–10b, 22b, 28a; Meilah 19a; Niddah 11a–b, 15b, 19a, 20b–21a, 24b, 27b, 30b–31a, 34a–b, 35b, 36b, 37b, 38b, 40a, 44a, 47b, 50a, 66a, 71b. Babylonia, 6th century. In, e.g., Talmud Bavli. Edited by Yisroel Simcha Schorr, Chaim Malinowitz, and Mordechai Marcus, 72 volumes. Brooklyn: Mesorah Publications, 2006.
Deuteronomy Rabbah 6:8. Land of Israel, circa 775–900 CE. In, e.g., Midrash Rabbah: Deuteronomy. Translated by Harry Freedman and Maurice Simon, volume 7, pages 125–26. London: Soncino Press, 1939.

Medieval
Solomon ibn Gabirol. A Crown for the King, 30:369–70. Spain, 11th century. Translated by David R. Slavitt, pages 48–49. New York: Oxford University Press, 1998.

Maimonides. The Guide for the Perplexed, part 1, chapter 42; part 3, chapters 41, 45, 47, 49. Cairo, Egypt, 1190. In, e.g., Moses Maimonides. The Guide for the Perplexed. Translated by Michael Friedländer, pages 56, 346, 357, 368, 379. New York: Dover Publications, 1956.
Rashi. Commentary. Leviticus 12–13. Troyes, France, late 11th century. In, e.g., Rashi. The Torah: With Rashi's Commentary Translated, Annotated, and Elucidated. Translated and annotated by Yisrael Isser Zvi Herczeg, volume 3, pages 135–57. Brooklyn: Mesorah Publications, 1994.
Rashbam. Commentary on the Torah. Troyes, early 12th century. In, e.g., Rashbam's Commentary on Leviticus and Numbers: An Annotated Translation. Edited and translated by Martin I. Lockshin, pages 69–76. Providence: Brown Judaic Studies, 2001.

Abraham ibn Ezra. Commentary on the Torah. Mid-12th century. In, e.g., Ibn Ezra's Commentary on the Pentateuch: Leviticus (Va-yikra). Translated and annotated by H. Norman Strickman and Arthur M. Silver, volume 3, pages 85–102. New York: Menorah Publishing Company, 2004.
Hezekiah ben Manoah. Hizkuni. France, circa 1240. In, e.g., Chizkiyahu ben Manoach. Chizkuni: Torah Commentary. Translated and annotated by Eliyahu Munk, volume 3, pages 713–28. Jerusalem: Ktav Publishers, 2013.
Nachmanides. Commentary on the Torah. Jerusalem, circa 1270. In, e.g., Ramban (Nachmanides): Commentary on the Torah. Translated by Charles B. Chavel, volume 3, pages 156–85. New York: Shilo Publishing House, 1974.

Zohar 3:42a–52a. Spain, late 13th century. In, e.g., The Zohar. Translated by Harry Sperling and Maurice Simon. 5 volumes. London: Soncino Press, 1934.
Bahya ben Asher. Commentary on the Torah. Spain, early 14th century. In, e.g., Midrash Rabbeinu Bachya: Torah Commentary by Rabbi Bachya ben Asher. Translated and annotated by Eliyahu Munk, volume 5, pages 1621–52. Jerusalem: Lambda Publishers, 2003.
Jacob ben Asher (Baal Ha-Turim). Commentary on the Torah. Early 14th century. In, e.g., Baal Haturim Chumash: Vayikra/Leviticus. Translated by Eliyahu Touger; edited, elucidated, and annotated by Avie Gold, volume 3, pages 1113–37. Brooklyn: Mesorah Publications, 2000.
Jacob ben Asher. Perush Al ha-Torah. Early 14th century. In, e.g., Yaakov ben Asher. Tur on the Torah. Translated and annotated by Eliyahu Munk, volume 3, pages 852–67. Jerusalem: Lambda Publishers, 2005.
Isaac ben Moses Arama. Akedat Yizhak (The Binding of Isaac). Late 15th century. In, e.g., Yitzchak Arama. Akeydat Yitzchak: Commentary of Rabbi Yitzchak Arama on the Torah. Translated and condensed by Eliyahu Munk, volume 2, pages 577–87. New York, Lambda Publishers, 2001.

Modern
Isaac Abravanel. Commentary on the Torah. Italy, between 1492 and 1509. In, e.g., Abarbanel: Selected Commentaries on the Torah: Volume 3: Vayikra/Leviticus. Translated and annotated by Israel Lazar, pages 106–19. Brooklyn: CreateSpace, 2015.
Obadiah ben Jacob Sforno. Commentary on the Torah. Venice, 1567. In, e.g., Sforno: Commentary on the Torah. Translation and explanatory notes by Raphael Pelcovitz, pages 538–49. Brooklyn: Mesorah Publications, 1997.
Moshe Alshich. Commentary on the Torah. Safed, circa 1593. In, e.g., Moshe Alshich. Midrash of Rabbi Moshe Alshich on the Torah. Translated and annotated by Eliyahu Munk, volume 2, pages 659–67. New York, Lambda Publishers, 2000.
Thomas Hobbes. Leviathan, 3:40. England, 1651. Reprint edited by C. B. Macpherson, pages 503–04. Harmondsworth, England: Penguin Classics, 1982.
Avraham Yehoshua Heschel. Commentaries on the Torah. Cracow, Poland, mid 17th century. Compiled as Chanukat HaTorah. Edited by Chanoch Henoch Erzohn. Piotrkow, Poland, 1900. In Avraham Yehoshua Heschel. Chanukas HaTorah: Mystical Insights of Rav Avraham Yehoshua Heschel on Chumash. Translated by Avraham Peretz Friedman, pages 219–21. Southfield, Michigan: Targum Press/Feldheim Publishers, 2004.
Shabbethai Bass. Sifsei Chachamim. Amsterdam, 1680. In, e.g., Sefer Vayikro: From the Five Books of the Torah: Chumash: Targum Okelos: Rashi: Sifsei Chachamim: Yalkut: Haftaros, translated by Avrohom Y. Davis, pages 211–48. Lakewood Township, New Jersey: Metsudah Publications, 2012.

Chaim ibn Attar. Ohr ha-Chaim. Venice, 1742. In Chayim ben Attar. Or Hachayim: Commentary on the Torah. Translated by Eliyahu Munk, volume 3, pages 1057–90. Brooklyn: Lambda Publishers, 1999.
Yitzchak Magriso. Me'am Lo'ez. Constantinople, 1753. In Yitzchak Magriso. The Torah Anthology: MeAm Lo'ez. Translated by Aryeh Kaplan, volume 11, pages 275–99. New York: Moznaim Publishing, 1989.
Nachman of Breslov. Teachings. Bratslav, Ukraine, before 1811. In Rebbe Nachman's Torah: Breslov Insights into the Weekly Torah Reading: Exodus-Leviticus. Compiled by Chaim Kramer; edited by Y. Hall, pages 337–40. Jerusalem: Breslov Research Institute, 2011.
Emily Dickinson. Poem 1733 (No man saw awe, nor to his house). 19th century. In The Complete Poems of Emily Dickinson. Edited by Thomas H. Johnson, page 703. New York: Little, Brown & Co., 1960.

Samuel David Luzzatto (Shadal). Commentary on the Torah. Padua, 1871. In, e.g., Samuel David Luzzatto. Torah Commentary. Translated and annotated by Eliyahu Munk, volume 3, pages 934–45. New York: Lambda Publishers, 2012.
Yehudah Aryeh Leib Alter. Sefat Emet. Góra Kalwaria (Ger), Poland, up to 1905. Excerpted in The Language of Truth: The Torah Commentary of Sefat Emet. Translated and interpreted by Arthur Green, pages 167–72. Philadelphia: Jewish Publication Society, 1998. Reprinted 2012.
Alexander Alan Steinbach. Sabbath Queen: Fifty-four Bible Talks to the Young Based on Each Portion of the Pentateuch, pages 84–87. New York: Behrman's Jewish Book House, 1936.
Thomas Mann. Joseph and His Brothers. Translated by John E. Woods, pages 101, 859. New York: Alfred A. Knopf, 2005. Originally published as Joseph und seine Brüder. Stockholm: Bermann-Fischer Verlag, 1943.

E.V. Hulse, "The Nature of Biblical ‘Leprosy' and the Use of Alternative Medical Terms in Modern Translations of the Bible." Palestine Exploration Quarterly. Volume 107 (1975): pages 87–105.
Gordon J. Wenham. The Book of Leviticus, pages 185–203. Grand Rapids, Michigan: William B. Eerdmans Publishing Company, 1979.
Walter Jacob. "Jewish Reaction to Epidemics (AIDS)." In Contemporary American Reform Responsa, pages 136–38. New York: Central Conference of American Rabbis, 1987.
Pinchas H. Peli. Torah Today: A Renewed Encounter with Scripture, pages 121–26. Washington, D.C.: B'nai B'rith Books, 1987.
Berit Mila in the Reform Context. Edited by Lewis M. Barth. Berit Mila Board of Reform Judaism, 1990.
Shaye J. D. Cohen. "Menstruants and the Sacred in Judaism and Christianity." In Women’s History and Ancient History. Edited by Sarah B. Pomeroy, pages 273–99. Chapel Hill: University of North Carolina Press, 1991.
Harvey J. Fields. A Torah Commentary for Our Times: Volume II: Exodus and Leviticus, pages 120–26. New York: UAHC Press, 1991.
Jacob Milgrom. "The Rationale for Biblical Impurity." Journal of the Ancient Near Eastern Society. Volume 22 (1993): pages 107–11.
Victor Avigdor Hurowitz. "Review Essay: Ancient Israelite Cult in History, Tradition, and Interpretation." AJS Review, volume 19 (number 2) (1994): pages 213–36.
Walter C. Kaiser Jr., " The Book of Leviticus," in The New Interpreter's Bible, volume 1, pages 1083–98. Nashville: Abingdon Press, 1994.
Judith S. Antonelli. "Childbirth." In In the Image of God: A Feminist Commentary on the Torah, pages 264–75. Northvale, New Jersey: Jason Aronson, 1995.
Ellen Frankel. The Five Books of Miriam: A Woman’s Commentary on the Torah, pages 163–66. New York: G. P. Putnam's Sons, 1996.
Lawrence A. Hoffman. Covenant of Blood: Circumcision and Gender in Rabbinic Judaism. Chicago: University of Chicago Press, 1996.

W. Gunther Plaut. The Haftarah Commentary, pages 268–76. New York: UAHC Press, 1996.
Sorel Goldberg Loeb and Barbara Binder Kadden. Teaching Torah: A Treasury of Insights and Activities, pages 183–88. Denver: A.R.E. Publishing, 1997.
Jacob Milgrom. Leviticus 1–16, volume 3, pages 742–826. New York: Anchor Bible, 1998.
Helaine Ettinger. "Our Children/God's Children." In The Women's Torah Commentary: New Insights from Women Rabbis on the 54 Weekly Torah Portions. Edited by Elyse Goldstein, pages 202–10. Woodstock, Vermont: Jewish Lights Publishing, 2000.
Frank H. Gorman Jr. "Leviticus." In The HarperCollins Bible Commentary. Edited by James L. Mays, pages 156–57. New York: HarperCollins Publishers, revised edition, 2000.
Lainie Blum Cogan and Judy Weiss. Teaching Haftarah: Background, Insights, and Strategies, pages 192–99. Denver: A.R.E. Publishing, 2002.
Michael Fishbane. The JPS Bible Commentary: Haftarot, pages 168–78. Philadelphia: Jewish Publication Society, 2002.
Robert Alter. The Five Books of Moses: A Translation with Commentary, pages 589–98. New York: W.W. Norton & Co., 2004.
Jacob Milgrom. Leviticus: A Book of Ritual and Ethics: A Continental Commentary, pages 122–32. Minneapolis: Fortress Press, 2004.
Baruch J. Schwartz. "Leviticus." In The Jewish Study Bible. Edited by Adele Berlin and Marc Zvi Brettler, pages 232–38. New York: Oxford University Press, 2004.
Mary Lande Zamore. "Haftarat Tazri’a: II Kings 4:42–5:19" In The Women's Haftarah Commentary: New Insights from Women Rabbis on the 54 Weekly Haftarah Portions, the 5 Megillot & Special Shabbatot. Edited by Elyse Goldstein, pages 125–29. Woodstock, Vermont: Jewish Lights Publishing, 2004.
Antony Cothey. “Ethics and Holiness in the Theology of Leviticus.” Journal for the Study of the Old Testament, volume 30 (number 2) (December 2005): pages 131–51.
Professors on the Parashah: Studies on the Weekly Torah Reading Edited by Leib Moscovitz, pages 175–79. Jerusalem: Urim Publications, 2005.
Frank Anthony Spina. "Naaman's Cure, Gehazi's Curse." In The Faith of the Outsider: Exclusion and Inclusion in the Biblical Story, pages 72–93. William B. Eerdmans Publishing Company, 2005.
Calum Carmichael. Illuminating Leviticus: A Study of Its Laws and Institutions in the Light of Biblical Narratives. Baltimore: Johns Hopkins University Press, 2006.
Bernard J. Bamberger. "Leviticus." In The Torah: A Modern Commentary: Revised Edition. Edited by W. Gunther Plaut; revised edition edited by David E.S. Stern, pages 734–49. New York: Union for Reform Judaism, 2006.
Suzanne A. Brody. "Birthing Contradictions." In Dancing in the White Spaces: The Yearly Torah Cycle and More Poems, page 88. Shelbyville, Kentucky: Wasteland Press, 2007.

James L. Kugel. How To Read the Bible: A Guide to Scripture, Then and Now, page 303. New York: Free Press, 2007.
Christophe Nihan. From Priestly Torah to Pentateuch: A Study in the Composition of the Book of Leviticus. Coronet Books, 2007.
James W. Watts. Ritual and Rhetoric in Leviticus: From Sacrifice to Scripture. New York: Cambridge University Press, 2007.
Tamara Cohn Eskenazi and Andrea L. Weiss, editors. The Torah: A Women's Commentary, pages 637–56. New York: URJ Press, 2008.
Roy E. Gane. "Leviticus." In Zondervan Illustrated Bible Backgrounds Commentary. Edited by John H. Walton, volume 1, pages 301–02. Grand Rapids, Michigan: Zondervan, 2009.
Reuven Hammer. Entering Torah: Prefaces to the Weekly Torah Portion, pages 159–64. New York: Gefen Publishing House, 2009.
Timothy Keller. "The Seduction of Success." In Counterfeit Gods: The Empty Promises of Money, Sex, and Power, and the Only Hope that Matters. Dutton Adult, 2009. (Naaman).
Ayala Sha’ashoua Miron. “Nagu’a: Touched by the Divine: Parashat Tazria (Leviticus 12:1–13:59).” In Torah Queeries: Weekly Commentaries on the Hebrew Bible. Edited by Gregg Drinkwater, Joshua Lesser, and David Shneer; foreword by Judith Plaskow, pages 140–44. New York: New York University Press, 2009.
Mark Leuchter. “The Politics of Ritual Rhetoric: A Proposed Sociopolitical Context for the Redaction of Leviticus 1–16.” Vetus Testamentum, volume 60 (number 3) (2010): pages 345–65.
Jeffrey Stackert. "Leviticus." In The New Oxford Annotated Bible: New Revised Standard Version with the Apocrypha: An Ecumenical Study Bible. Edited by Michael D. Coogan, Marc Z. Brettler, Carol A. Newsom, and Pheme Perkins, pages 158–61. New York: Oxford University Press, Revised 4th Edition 2010.
Dorothea Erbele-Küster. “Gender and Cult: ‘Pure’ and ‘Impure’ as Gender-Relevant Categories.” In Irmtraud Fischer and Mercedes Navarro Puerto with Andrea Taschl-Erber, editors. Torah, pages 375–406. Atlanta: Society of Biblical Literature, 2011.
Alexander Massey. “‘If male, is he circumcised?’ Covenant, Community, Compassion and Conscience.” (2011; revised 2019).
Jonathan Haidt. The Righteous Mind: Why Good People Are Divided by Politics and Religion, pages 148, 210. New York: Pantheon, 2012. (evolutionarily justified disgust as motivation for casting out lepers; circumcision as tribal symbolic marking).

Tracy M. Lemos. “Where There Is Dirt, Is There System? Revisiting Biblical Purity Constructions.” Journal for the Study of the Old Testament, volume 37 (number 3) (March 2013): pages 265–94.
Shmuel Herzfeld. "Pray for Health." In Fifty-Four Pick Up: Fifteen-Minute Inspirational Torah Lessons, pages 156–59. Jerusalem: Gefen Publishing House, 2012.
Aaron Panken. "The Checklist Imperative." The Jerusalem Report, volume 24 (number 26) (April 7, 2014): page 47.

Stephanie Butnick. "Bas Relief Depicts Circumcision in Ancient Egypt: Relic from 2400 BCE believed to be the oldest illustration of the ritual." Tablet Magazine. (June 18, 2014).
Jonathan Sacks. Covenant & Conversation: A Weekly Reading of the Jewish Bible: Leviticus: The Book of Holiness, pages 163–98. Jerusalem: Maggid Books, 2015.
Jonathan Sacks. Lessons in Leadership: A Weekly Reading of the Jewish Bible, pages 141–45. New Milford, Connecticut: Maggid Books, 2015.
Jonathan Sacks. Essays on Ethics: A Weekly Reading of the Jewish Bible, pages 171–76. New Milford, Connecticut: Maggid Books, 2016.
Shai Held. The Heart of Torah, Volume 2: Essays on the Weekly Torah Portion: Leviticus, Numbers, and Deuteronomy, pages 37–46. Philadelphia: Jewish Publication Society, 2017.
Steven Levy and Sarah Levy. The JPS Rashi Discussion Torah Commentary, pages 86–89. Philadelphia: Jewish Publication Society, 2017.
Irit Dekel, Bernhard Forchtner, and Ibrahim Efe. “Circumcising the Body: Negotiating Difference and Belonging in Germany.” National Identitie (2019).
Alessandro Massa. “The European Convention on Human Rights and Ritual Male Circumcision: Religion, Family, Rights.” (2019).

External links

Texts
Masoretic text and 1917 JPS translation
Hear the parashah chanted 
Hear the parashah read in Hebrew

Commentaries

| width="25%" align="left" valign="top" style="border:0"|
Academy for Jewish Religion, California
Academy for Jewish Religion, New York
Aish.com
Akhlah: The Jewish Children's Learning Network
Aleph Beta Academy
American Jewish University—Ziegler School of Rabbinic Studies
Anshe Emes Synagogue, Los Angeles
Ari Goldwag
Ascent of Safed
Bar-Ilan University
Chabad.org
| width="25%" align="top" style="border:0"|
eparsha.com
G-dcast
The Israel Koschitzky Virtual Beit Midrash
Jewish Agency for Israel
Jewish Theological Seminary
Learningtorah.org
Mechon Hadar
MyJewishLearning.com
Ohr Sameach
ON Scripture—The Torah 
Orthodox Union
OzTorah—Torah from Australia
Oz Ve Shalom—Netivot Shalom
| width="25%" align="top" style="border:0"|
Pardes from Jerusalem
Professor James L. Kugel
Professor Michael Carasik
Rabbi Dov Linzer
Rabbi Fabian Werbin
Rabbi Jonathan Sacks
RabbiShimon.com
Rabbi Shlomo Riskin
Rabbi Shmuel Herzfeld
Rabbi Stan Levin
Reconstructionist Judaism 
Sephardic Institute 
Shiur.com
| width="25%" align="top" style="border:0"|
613.org Jewish Torah Audio
Tanach Study Center
Teach613.org, Torah Education at Cherry Hill
TheTorah.com
Torah from Dixie 
Torah.org
Torahvort.com
Union for Reform Judaism
United Synagogue of Conservative Judaism
What's Bothering Rashi?
Yeshivat Chovevei Torah
Yeshiva University

Weekly Torah readings from Leviticus
Weekly Torah readings in Adar
Weekly Torah readings in Iyar